Pirbəyli (also, Pirbeyli) is a village and the least populous municipality in the Shamakhi Rayon of Azerbaijan.  It has a population of 184.

References 

Populated places in Shamakhi District